Złotoryja (Latin: Aureus Mons, Aurum) is a historic town in Lower Silesian Voivodeship in southwestern Poland, the administrative seat of Złotoryja County, and of the smaller Gmina Złotoryja. Having been granted town privileges in 1211, Złotoryja is the oldest town in Poland. Since the Middle Ages, it was a centre of gold and copper mining. Złotoryja was also featured among the most beautiful towns in Poland due to its location and architectural heritage.

Geography

In the south, the Katzbach Mountains (Góry Kaczawskie) stretch up to the Krkonoše range of the Western Sudetes. Currently Złotoryja has approximately 16,000 inhabitants and is one of the important centres of basalt mining.

Town's name
During its long existence Złotoryja was referred to by various names. Since the Middle Ages it was referred to as either Aurum (Latin for "gold"), Aureus Mons ("Golden Mountain"), Goldberg (German for "Golden Mountain") or by its Polish name. Złotoryja in Polish literally means "gold-digging", referring to historic gold-panning sites on the Kaczawa river.

Coat of arms and flag
The Coat of Arms features a black eagle of the Silesian Piast dynasty standing over three green hills, with the golden background. Its heraldic blazon is "Or, an eagle displayed sable on a base three-invected vert". It has been used since the 15th century.

The Flag features both of the heraldic colours of the Coat of Arms. It consists of two stripes: golden (yellow) above green.

History

Middle Ages

In the early Middle Ages the region was inhabited by the tribe of Trzebowianie, one of the Polish tribes, and in the 10th century the area was included in the emerging Polish state.

In the late 12th century and early 13th century a small settlement of gold miners was founded on the slopes of Mount St. Nicholas (Góra św. Mikołaja), located at the shores of the Kaczawa river. The village grew rapidly and in 1211 it was documented as Aurum and vested with town rights according to Magdeburg law by the Piast duke Henry I the Bearded, the first city throughout then-fragmented Poland and plausibly the first Silesian town with German institutions and German settlers. Henry I financed the construction of the St. Mary's Church, which was later expanded and is now one of the town's landmarks. In the 13th century a Hospitaller and Franciscan monastery were founded in the town, which thus became one of the important cultural and religious centres of the region. During the Mongol invasion of Poland, in 1241 many of the miners took part in the Battle of Legnica, where most of them died, but the mining quickly recovered.

During the ongoing fragmentation of Poland into smaller duchies, in 1248 the town was attached to the newly established Duchy of Legnica and in 1290 was granted with a privilege to trade salt, one of the most expensive and valuable minerals in the Middle Ages. In 1329, under the rule of Duke Bolesław III the Generous, the whole Duchy of Legnica became a fief of the Kingdom of Bohemia under King John the Blind, yet it retained its local self-government. During the 15th century Hussite Wars the town was captured by the Hussite forces in 1427, 1428 and 1431. It was severely pillaged, but it quickly recovered and the local city council decided to build city walls in order to spare the city such troubles in the future. Much of the mediaeval fortifications is preserved until today.

Early modern period

Although by the early 15th century most of the gold deposits were depleted, the town started to gain significant income from the nearby Via Regia trade route linking Wrocław with Leipzig. A brewery and several weavers shops were opened soon afterwards. In 1504 a school was opened by Hieronymus Aurimontanus. In 1522 the first Protestant priests arrived and soon afterwards the school was turned into a Latin, humanistic gymnasium, the first in Silesia. One of its rectors, Valentin Trozendorf, wanted to turn it into a university and these plans were approved by Duke Frederick II of Legnica; however the prince died soon afterwards and the town was struck by a severe fire in 1554, which made the plans obsolete. Nevertheless, the school attracted students from Silesia, Greater Poland and Bohemia.

In 1526 the town together with the rest of the Bohemian crown land of Silesia came under the suzerainty of the Austrian House of Habsburg. It remained part of the Piast-ruled Duchy of Legnica until 1675. Goldberg continued to prosper until 1608, when the prosperity was stopped by a major flood that killed approx. 50 of the inhabitants and damaged large part of the city. Five years later, in 1613 the town yet again was struck by great fire that destroyed 571 houses. To help rebuild the town, in 1621 the duke of Legnica granted the right to mint coins, a privilege the town enjoyed for two years. During the Thirty Years' War Goldberg changed hands several times and suffered especially in 1633, when Albrecht von Wallenstein, a former pupil of the gymnasium, beleaguered the city. After the war Goldberg needed almost 100 years to recover. Duke Louis IV of Legnica granted new privileges aiming to help the town prosper through the development of cloth production.

After the dissolution of the Piast Duchy of Legnica in 1675, the town was integrated with the Bohemian (Czech) Kingdom. After it came under the authority of the Czech kings, in 1676 Leopold I confirmed all privileges, and in 1688 allowed the organization of an annual fair. In 1742 it was annexed by the Kingdom of Prussia in the First Silesian War.

Late modern period
During the Napoleonic Wars and Polish national liberation fights, in May 1807, Polish uhlans passed through the town. In 1810 the Prussian administration closed down the Bernardine monastery. On August 26, 1813, the armies of French marshal Macdonald was defeated near the town by the forces of Prussian general von Blücher.

In 1848 riots and looting took place, and in 1849 an epidemic broke out. In 1862 the town of Silberberg was connected with Berlin by a telegraph. Goldberg became part of the newly formed German Empire in 1871 and at the end of the 19th century the town started to recover after almost 200 years of crisis. In 1884 the town was connected to Liegnitz (Legnica) by a rail road and by 1906 two additional lines were opened: to Świerzawa and Chojnów. In 1900 the first telephone line was started. At the same time various companies tried to recover the gold mining in and around the city, but the plans were soon abandoned. Instead the copper ore mines were opened, but they faced serious financial difficulties by the end of the 1920s. During the 1933 Reichstag elections about 25% of the inhabitants backed the Nazi Party.
Historical population of Złotoryja

World War II and recent history

During World War II, the Germans created two branches of the Stalag VIII-A prisoner-of-war camp and two forced labour camps in the town. Among the prisoners were mainly Poles, French and Italians. The town survived the World War II almost untouched. In February 1945 it was captured by the forces of the Red Army 2nd Ukrainian Front under Ivan Konev. Following the decisions of the Potsdam conference, in May it was transferred to Poland and renamed by Poles to the historic Polish Złotoryja. By 1949 most of local German inhabitants either fled or were expelled and had to leave all their possession behind, forced by the military occupying power Russia and Poland. A large number of them were admeasured to refugee camps and settled later, mostly in the federal state Northrhine-Westphalia, Germany.

In the nearby villages of Wilków and Nowy Kościół two important copper mines were founded and a large number of local engineers also participated in the development of the industrial region of Legnica. However, in the early 1970s the mines were closed down because ore deposits of much higher quality were found around Lubin.

Many factories were founded, including a shoe factory, Christmas tree ornaments factory and a basalt mine. Since 1989 the town of Złotoryja started to look for its past. The historical old town was restored and the traditions of gold mining were started. In 1992 a local Polish Guild of Gold Prospectors was started, which ever since organises the Polish Gold Panning Championships. In 2000 World Championships were held there.

Currently the town is one of the main tourist centres of the area. The heavy industry is also playing an important part in the development of the area. The local quarries are ones of the most profitable in Poland and the Christmas tree ornaments factory is exporting millions of ornaments every year, mostly to Western Europe and the United States.

Main sights

 Market Square (Rynek) filled with picturesque townhouses and the Neoclassical town hall
 St. Mary's Church, built in Romanesque and Gothic styles, founded by Duke Henry I the Bearded, is Złotoryja's most valuable historic building and one of the city's most recognizable landmarks
 14th century city walls
 Blacksmiths Tower (Baszta Kowalska)
 St. Hedwig's Church
 Holy Cross Church (commonly referred to as St. Nicholas's Church)
 Fountains
 Gold Mining Museum, formerly the "Muzeum Złota w Złotoryi" ("Złotoryja's Gold Museum") now the "Muzeum Społeczne Ziemi Złotoryjskiej" ("Museum of the Złotoryja Land Society")

Notable people
 Valentin Trozendorf (1490–1556), Protestant pedagogue and theologian
 Johann Wilhelm Oelsner (1766–1848), educator, industrialist
 Ernst Zinner (1886–1970), astronomer
 Wilhelm Gliese (1915–1993), astronomer
 Mariusz Szczygieł (born 1966), journalist and writer, winner of the 2019 Nike Award

Twin towns – sister cities

Złotoryja is twinned with:

 Buchach, Ukraine
 Mimoň, Czech Republic
 Pulsnitz, Germany
 Westerburg, Germany

References

External links

 Silberberg on 1600 map of Germany
 Silberberg in Duchy Monsterberg, Silesia on 1600 map
 Official Website of Złotoryja
 Polish Guild of Gold Prospectors
 Virtual Złotoryja project
 download

Cities and towns in Lower Silesian Voivodeship
Złotoryja County
Magdeburg rights